Siculo-Arabic, also known as Sicilian Arabic, is the term used for varieties of Arabic that were spoken in the Emirate of Sicily (which included Malta) from the 9th century, persisting under the subsequent Norman rule until the 13th century. It was derived from early Maghrebi Arabic following the Abbasid conquest of Sicily in the 9th century and gradually marginalized following the Norman conquest in the 11th century.

Siculo-Arabic is extinct and is designated as a historical language that is attested only in writings from the 9th–13th centuries in Sicily. However, present-day Maltese is considered to be its sole surviving descendant, it being in foundation a Semitic language that evolved from one of the dialects of Siculo-Arabic over the past 800 years, though in a gradual process of Latinisation that gave Maltese a significant Romance superstrate influence. By contrast, present-day Sicilian, which is an Italo-Dalmatian Romance language, retains very little Siculo-Arabic, with its influence being limited to some 300 words.

History

Introduction to Sicily

During the 7th and 8th centuries, Sicily was raided from Tunis. The eventual Muslim Arab conquest of Byzantine Sicily was piecemeal and slow. The region was a frontier zone, even after the fall of Taormina in 962, which completed the invasion. Romance languages such as African Romance continued to be used in the island well after the Arabic conquest. Its speakers were largely made up of Sicilian Muslims. However, based on the foundation charter on the Church of Santa Maria dell'Ammiraglio (written in both Greek and Arabic), it can be speculated that Siculo-Arabic was also the mother tongue for many Sicilian, in this case Palermo’s, Orthodox Christians.

Norman kingdom of Sicily
When the Normans entered Sicily, the island was divided into two main non-Latin linguistic groups:
 Arabic speakers mostly in Palermo, Agrigento, Butera, Enna and Noto
 Greek speakers mostly in Messina, Taormina, Cefalù, Catania and Syracuse

In 1086, the Normans managed to secure the conversion of the last important Kalbid ruler of Enna Ibn Hamud. This conversion along with the Norman adoption of many Arab governing customs resulted in the emergence of a Christian Siculo-Arabic language. During the Norman era the chancery office operated in Arabic, Greek and Latin.

The Nuzhat al-mushtāq fi'khtirāq al-āfāq (lit. "the book of pleasant journeys into faraway lands"), most often known as the Tabula Rogeriana (lit. The Book of Roger in Latin) is a description of the world and world map created by the Palermo-based Arab geographer Muhammad al-Idrisi in 1154. Al-Idrisi worked on the commentaries and illustrations of the map for fifteen years at the court of the Norman King Roger II of Sicily, who commissioned the work around 1138.

Decline after 1200
In the post-conquest period, both Arabic and Greek were sometimes used by the new rulers and subsequently used in the king's fiscal administration, which managed royal lands and men in Sicily and Calabria. The many documents that it issued are among the main and most important sources for Arabic in Sicily. However, when the Hohenstaufen replaced the Normans, Arabic was dropped as a language of government in 1194 and the Hohenstaufen expelled the remaining Muslims to Lucera and North Africa in the 13th century.  Due to the expulsions, the only remaining Siculo-Arabic speakers were Christians.

When the Aragonese took Sicily they introduced Catalan nobility, made Latin the only official language; Greek and Arabic official records in Sicily ceased to exist by the 14th century.

Arabic influence continued in a number of Sicilian words. Most of these terms relate to agriculture and related activities.

Maltese language

The modern language derived from the Siculo-Arabic spoken in Malta is known as the Maltese language. While "Siculo-Arabic" refers to the language spoken before 1300, hardly any records exist from the 14th century, and the earliest record in the Maltese language is Il-Kantilena (Xidew il-Qada) by Pietru Caxaro (late 15th century), which is written in the Latin script.

Maltese evolved from Siculo-Arabic through a gradual process of Latinisation following the re-Christianisation of Malta (which was complete by 1250). Some items of Siculo-Arabic vocabulary are comparable with later items found in Maltese. Although Siculo-Arabic has had a relatively minor influence on modern-day Sicilian, this language has also absorbed many Siculo-Arabic words, with those shown in the table a small sample:

See also 
 Varieties of Arabic
 Maghrebi Arabic
 Pantesco dialect, a dialect of Sicilian with unusually high levels of Arabic influence

References

Sources

External links
Agius, Dionisius A. "Who Spoke Siculo Arabic?", XII Incontro Italiano di Linguistica Camitio-semitica (Afroasiatica), ATTI a cura di Marco Moriggi, Rubbettino 2007. 25–33. 

Arabic languages
Arabs in Italy
Emirate of Sicily
Extinct languages of Italy
Maghrebi Arabic
Languages of Sicily
Languages attested from the 9th century
Languages extinct in the 13th century
9th-century establishments in Europe
13th-century disestablishments in Europe
Articles containing video clips